The IEEE Fourier Award for Signal Processing is a Technical Field Award that is given by the Institute of Electrical and Electronics Engineers. This award is presented for contributions in the field of signal processing.

The award is named after Joseph Fourier, a French mathematician and physicist who is noted for the representation of periodic signals as linear superpositions of sine-wave basis functions known as the Fourier series, and applications of the Fourier Series to the analysis of vibration and heat transfer. The Fourier transform, which is widely used throughout electrical engineering and in particular signal processing, image processing, and communication theory, is also named in his honor.

The IEEE Fourier Award for Signal Processing may be presented to an individual or team of up to three people.

Recipients of the IEEE Fourier Award for Signal Processing receive a bronze medal, certificate, and honorarium. The Fourier Award is presented annually at the IEEE International Conference on Acoustics, Speech, and Signal Processing (ICASSP) in the Spring.

Recipients 
 2023: Rabab Ward
 2022: Ali H. Sayed
 2021: K.J. Ray Liu
 2020: Alfred O. Hero III
 2019: Alan Conrad Bovik
 2018: Peter Stoica
 2017: Russell Mersereau
 2016: Bede Liu
 2015: Georgios B. Giannakis

See also

 List of engineering awards

References

External links 

IEEE Fourier Award for Signal Processing web page
List of Recipients of IEEE Fourier Award for Signal Processing

IEEE awards
Awards established in 2015